The China women's national artistic gymnastics team represents China in FIG international competitions.

History
China has participated in the Olympic Games women's team competition ten times. It has won three medals, including the gold medal in 2008. The team has also won seven medals at the World Artistic Gymnastics Championships, including the gold medal in 2006.

Current senior roster
 Chen Xiaoqing
 He Licheng
 Liu Jieyu
 Liu Jingxing
 Luo Huan 
 Luo Rui
 Lu Yufei
 Ou Yushan
 Sun Xinyi
 Qian Xuejia
  Qi Qi
 Qiu Qiyuan
 Tang Xijing
 Wang Jingying
 Wei Xiaoyuan 
 Wu Ran
 Xiang Lulu
 Yin Sisi
 Yu Linmin
 Zhao Shiting 
 Zhang Jin
 Zhou Ruiyu
 Zuo Tong

Team competition results

Olympic Games
 1928 through 1980 — did not participate
 1984 —  bronze medal
Ma Yanhong, Wu Jiani, Chen Yongyan, Zhou Ping, Zhou Qiurui, Huang Qun
 1988 — 6th place
Chen Cuiting, Fan Di, Wang Wenjing, Wang Huiying, Ma Ying, Wang Xiaoyan
 1992 — 4th place
Yang Bo, Lu Li, Li Yifang, Li Li, He Xuemei, Zhang Xia
 1996 — 4th place
Mo Huilan, Mao Yanling, Qiao Ya, Liu Xuan, Ji Liya, Kui Yuanyuan, Bi Wenjing
 2000 — disqualified
Yang Yun, Ling Jie, Dong Fangxiao, Liu Xuan, Huang Mandan, Kui Yuanyuan
 2004 — 7th place
Cheng Fei, Fan Ye, Li Ya, Lin Li, Wang Tiantian, Zhang Nan
 2008 —  gold medal
Yang Yilin, Cheng Fei, Jiang Yuyuan, Deng Linlin, He Kexin, Li Shanshan
 2012 — 4th place
Huang Qiushuang, Deng Linlin, Sui Lu, Yao Jinnan, He Kexin
 2016 —  bronze medal
Shang Chunsong, Wang Yan, Fan Yilin, Tan Jiaxin, Mao Yi
 2020 — 7th place
Lu Yufei, Ou Yushan, Tang Xijing, Zhang Jin

World Championships

 1987 – 4th place
Chen Cuiting, Fan Di, Wang Xiaoyan, Luo Feng, Ma Ying, Wang Huiying
 1989 —  bronze medal
Yang Bo, Chen Cuiting, Fan Di, Li Yan, Wang Wenjing, Ma Ying
 1991 – 4th place
Shi Liying, Li Li, Li Yifang, Li Yan, Yang Bo, Zhang Wenning
 1994 – 4th place
Mo Huilan, Yuan Kexia, Liu Xuan, He Xuemei, Guang Yuging, Ye Linlin, Qiao Ya
 1995 —  silver medal
Mo Huilan, Mao Yanling, Meng Fei, Qiao Ya, Liu Xuan, Ye Linlin, Ji Liya
 1997 —  bronze medal
Bi Wenjing, Kui Yuanyuan, Liu Xuan, Meng Fei, Mo Huilan, Zhou Duan
 1999 – Disqualified
Bai Chunyue, Dong Fangxiao, Huang Mandan, Ling Jie, Liu Xuan, Xu Jing

 2001 – Did not participate
 2003 — 4th place
Fan Ye, Kang Xin, Li Ya, Lin Li, Wang Tiantian, Zhang Nan
 2006 —  gold medal
Cheng Fei, He Ning, Li Ya, Pang Panpan, Zhang Nan, Zhou Zhuoru
 2007 —  silver medal
Cheng Fei, He Ning, Jiang Yuyuan, Li Shanshan, Xiao Sha, Yang Yilin
 2010 —  bronze medal
Deng Linlin, He Kexin, Huang Qiushuang, Jiang Yuyuan, Sui Lu, Yang Yilin
 2011 —  bronze medal
He Kexin, Huang Qiushuang, Jiang Yuyuan, Sui Lu, Tan Sixin, Yao Jinnan
 2014 —  silver medal
Bai Yawen, Chen Siyi, Huang Huidan, Shang Chunsong, Tan Jiaxin, Yao Jinnan
 2015 –  silver medal
Chen Siyi, Fan Yilin, Mao Yi, Shang Chunsong, Tan Jiaxin, Wang Yan, 
 2018 —  bronze medal
Chen Yile, Liu Jinru, Liu Tingting, Luo Huan, Zhang Jin
 2019 — 4th place
Chen Yile, Li Shijia, Liu Tingting, Qi Qi, Tang Xijing
 2022 — 6th place
Luo Rui, Ou Yushan, Tang Xijing, Wei Xiaoyuan, Zhang Jin

Junior World Championships
 2019 —  silver medal
Guan Chenchen, Ou Yushan, Wei Xiaoyuan, Wu Ran

Most decorated gymnasts
This list includes all Chinese female artistic gymnasts who have won at least four medals at the Olympic Games and the World Artistic Gymnastics Championships combined.

See also 
 List of Olympic female artistic gymnasts for China

References

Gymnastics in China
National women's artistic gymnastics teams
Women's national sports teams of China